The 2011–12 Stanford Cardinal men's basketball team represented Stanford University during the 2011–12 NCAA Division I men's basketball season. The Cardinal, led by fourth year head coach Johnny Dawkins, played their home games at Maples Pavilion and are members of the Pac-12 Conference. They finished with the record of 26–11 overall, 10–8 in Pac-12 play. They lost in the quarterfinals of the 2012 Pac-12 Conference men's basketball tournament to California. They were invited to the 2012 National Invitation Tournament where they advanced to the championship game and defeated the Minnesota Golden Gophers to become the 2012 NIT Champions.

Roster

Schedule and results

|-
!colspan=12 style=| Exhibition

|-
!colspan=12 style=| Regular season

|-
!colspan=12 style=| Pac-12 tournament

|-
!colspan=12 style=|2012 NIT
|-

.

References

Stanford Cardinal
Stanford Cardinal men's basketball seasons
Stanford Cardinal
National Invitation Tournament championship seasons
Stanford Cardinal men's basketball
Stanford Cardinal men's basketball